William Chipley may refer to:
 William Dudley Chipley, American railroad executive and politician
 William Stout Chipley, American psychologist
 Bill Chipley, American football player and coach